The Pigeon Point Formation is a geologic formation  in San Mateo County, California.

Geology
It is found on the western San Francisco Peninsula, on the coast and with its inland section is near the San Gregorio Fault system.

It was formed in the Campanian and Maastrichtian ages of the Late Cretaceous epoch, during the Mesozoic Era.

Fossils
The Pigeon Point Formation preserves fossils dating back to the Cretaceous period.

See also

 
 
 List of fossiliferous stratigraphic units in California

References
Field Guide to the Upper Cretaceous Pigeon Point Formation, U.S. Geological Survey
 

Geologic formations of California
Upper Cretaceous Series of North America
Cretaceous California
Campanian Stage
Maastrichtian Stage of North America
Geology of San Mateo County, California